Tuomas Latikka (born 20 September 1985) is a Finnish football player currently playing for JJK.

References
#13 Tuomas Latikka
Guardian Football

1985 births
Living people
Finnish footballers
JJK Jyväskylä players
Veikkausliiga players
Association football defenders
Sportspeople from Jyväskylä
21st-century Finnish people